Antoniinae is a subfamily of bee flies in the family Bombyliidae. There are at least 4 genera and 20 described species in Antoniinae.

Genera
These four genera belong to the subfamily Antoniinae:
 Antonia Loew, 1856 c g
 Antoniaustralia Becker, 1912 c g
 Cyx Evenhuis, 1993 c g
 Myonema Roberts, 1929 c g
Data sources: i = ITIS, c = Catalogue of Life, g = GBIF, b = Bugguide.net

References

Further reading

 
 
 

Bombyliidae